The Courts of Appeal in Albania are Second Instance Courts that have the power to review cases adjudicated by the District Courts that have been appealed by the parties to such cases.  The Courts of Appeal are presided by a panel of three judges.  The decisions of these judges can be further appealed to the Supreme Court of Albania.

Courts 

The Courts of Appeal generally have territorial jurisdiction over a prescribed area, and at the moment there are 7 Courts of Appeals, composed of 89 Judges.

The Courts of Second Instance in Albania are as follows:

 Court of Appeals of Durrës
 Court of Appeals of Gjirokastër
 Court of Appeals of Korçë
 Court of Appeals of Shkodër
 Court of Appeals of Tiranë
 Court of Appeals of Vlorë

In addition, there is a Court of Second Instance with jurisdiction over the entire territory of the Republic of Albania:

 Court of Appeals for Serious Crimes.

See also 
 Politics of Albania
 Judiciary of Albania

References 

Courts in Albania